A Frisian eagle is a specific kind of eagle in Dutch heraldry, consisting of half of a black double-headed eagle on the dexter side of a shield parted per pale.

It originated as a mark of favour granted to certain Frisian noblemen by the Holy Roman Emperor, and is still borne in the arms of a number of Frisian families. The correct blazon in Dutch is: Gedeeld: I in goud een zwarte Friese adelaar komende uit de deellijn [Per pale: Or, a Frisian eagle sable rising from the line of partition.]

Examples

See also

Karelsprivilege
Magnus Forteman
Hessel Hermana
Grietman
Reichsadler

References

Frisia
Heraldic eagles